Sidekicks is a martial arts television series, a spin-off of the Walt Disney 1986 special, The Last Electric Knight. The series starred Ernie Reyes Jr. as Ernie Lee, the Last Electric Knight, and Gil Gerard as Sergeant Jake Rizzo. Sidekicks aired as part of ABC's Friday night primetime lineup during the 1986-1987 season at 9 pm. After Life with Lucy was cancelled, Sidekicks moved to Saturdays at 8 pm.

Synopsis 
Sergeant Jake Rizzo (Gil Gerard) is chosen by Sabasan as tutor of his grandson Ernie Lee (Ernie Reyes, Jr.), the last heir of an ancient clan of special martial artists and a highly trained karate fighter.

Through the series, Ernie often tends to get into dangerous situations where bullies at school or in the streets of Los Angeles threaten him or his friends, or in dangerous situations where his adoptive father ends up needing his help after criminals which he has captured try to escape or try to harm him. With help of his quick moves, unique powerful skills and the clever advice of his deceased grandfather, Ernie manages every time to overcome all of the dangerous situations he gets into and manages to overwhelm his opponents.

Characters 
 Ernie Lee - played by Ernie Reyes Jr. - The Last Electric Knight, the main character of the series. Ernie is a young boy who specializes in martial arts.
 Sergeant Jake Rizzo - played by Gil Gerard - Ernie's adoptive father, works as a police officer
 Sabasan - played by Keye Luke - Ernie's deceased grandfather, who appears through the series in short flashbacks. As Ernie is faced with new dilemmas in each episode, he often meditates in order to reach the appropriate solution. In a similar fashion to Luke's role as Master Po in Kung Fu, Ernie recalls advice previously given to him by Sabasan which helps him in the present.
 Patricia Blake - played by Nancy Stafford - Sergeant Rizzo's love interest
 Capt. Blanks - Rizzo and Mooney's commanding officer, played by Vinny Argiro
 Det. R.T. Mooney - Sgt. Rizzo's partner, played by Frank Bonner

Episode list

TV movie

Season 1

Alternative titles
 Le Chevalier Lumière (French title)
 ילד הקראטה (Yeled Ha-Karate) (Israeli title, translated: The Karate Kid)
 El Karateca eléctrico (Latin American title)
 El Pequeño Karateca (Argentinian, Chilean, Colombian and Venezuelan title)
 O Pequeno Mestre (Brazilian title)
 태권소년 어니 (Korean title)
 功夫小子 (Gongfu Xiaozi) (Chinese title)
 Az utolsó(elektromos)lovag (Hungarian title)
 Partnerzy (Polish title, translated: Partners)
 Partnerid (Estonian title, translated: Partners)

Series ownership
DePasse Entertainment as successor to Motown Productions and Disney-ABC Domestic Television as a successor to Walt Disney Television currently own series rights.

References

External links

Sidekicks intro video (Youtube)

1986 American television series debuts
1987 American television series endings
American Broadcasting Company original programming
Disney Channel original programming
English-language television shows
Fictional duos
Martial arts television series
Television series by Disney
Television shows set in Los Angeles